Nicholas Bernard Kehoe III (May 28, 1943 – December 18, 2022) was a lieutenant general in the United States Air Force (USAF) who served as a fighter pilot during the Vietnam War. His last active duty assignment was as the Inspector General of the Air Force, Office of the Secretary of the Air Force. After over 34 years of military service, Kehoe continued in public service as the Assistant Inspector General in the U.S. Department of Housing and Urban Development (HUD). As of March 1, 2003, he became the President and CEO of the Medal of Honor Society.

Air Force career
Raised in Rochester, New York, Kehoe graduated from the United States Air Force Academy in 1966 with a Bachelor of Science degree. He was commissioned a second lieutenant on June 8, 1966.

Kehoe was a command pilot with over 3,600 hours of flight hours in the T-37 Tweet, T-38 Talon, F-4 Phantom II, F-15 Eagle and other aircraft. During the Vietnam War, he served two combat tours, earning the Distinguished Flying Cross and 28 Air Medals.

In September 1998,  Kehoe became the inspector general, Office of the Secretary of the Air Force, the Pentagon, Washington, D.C. — overseeing USAF inspection policy; criminal investigations; counterintelligence operations; the complaints and fraud, waste and abuse programs; intelligence oversight; and two field operating agencies, the Air Force Inspection Agency and the Air Force Office of Special Investigations.

General Kehoe retired from the United States Air Force on October 1, 2000, after over 34 years of service. He died at the age of 79 on December 18, 2022.

Summary of assignments
 September 1966 - September 1967, student, undergraduate pilot training, Williams Air Force Base, Arizona
 September 1967 - June 1968, student, F-4 combat crew training, Davis-Monthan Air Force Base, Arizona, and George Air Force Base, California
 June 1968 - June 1969, F-4 pilot, 555th Tactical Fighter Squadron, Udon Royal Thai Air Force Base, Thailand
 June 1969 - February 1970, F-4 upgrade training, George Air Force Base, California
 February 1970 - March 1971, F-4 pilot, 390th Tactical Fighter Squadron, Da Nang Air Base, Republic of Vietnam
 March 1971 - December 1973, T-38 instructor pilot and assistant chief, Wing Operations Division, Williams Air Force Base, Arizona
 December 1973 - December 1976, staff officer and chief, Airspace and Air Traffic Control Division, Directorate of Training, Headquarters Air Training Command, Randolph Air Force Base, Texas
 December 1976 - December 1978, chief of training, 86th Tactical Fighter Group, and operations officer, 512th Tactical Fighter Squadron, Ramstein Air Base, West Germany
 December 1978 - June 1979, student, Royal Air Force Air War College, RAF Cranwell, England
 June 1979 - August 1981, senior USAF adviser to British Joint Warfare Wing, National Defense College, Latimer House, Latimer, England
 August 1981 - September 1983, director of social actions, Headquarters Tactical Air Command (TAC), Langley Air Force Base, Virginia
 September 1983 - January 1986, deputy commander for operations and vice commander, 1st Tactical Fighter Wing, Langley Air Force Base, Virginia
 January 1986 - October 1986, director of inspection, Office of the Inspector General, Headquarters TAC, Langley Air Force Base, Virginia
 October 1986 - August 1988, vice commander and commander, 12th Flying Training Wing, Randolph Air Force Base, Texas
 August 1988 - May 1990, assistant deputy chief of staff for plans and requirements, Headquarters Air Training Command, Randolph Air Force Base, Texas
 May 1990 - July 1992, deputy director for regional plans and policy, Office of the Deputy Chief of Staff for Plans and Operations, Headquarters USAF, the Pentagon, Washington, D.C.
 July 1992 - October 1994, assistant chief of staff for operations and logistics, Supreme Headquarters Allied Powers Europe, Mons, Belgium
 October 1994 - November 1995, commander, 19th Air Force, Randolph Air Force Base, Texas
 November 1995 - September 1998, deputy chairman, North Atlantic Treaty Organization Military Committee, Headquarters NATO, Brussels, Belgium
 September 1998 - October 2000, Inspector General, Office of the Secretary of the Air Force, the Pentagon, Washington, D.C.

Promotion record
Second Lieutenant Jun 8, 1966
First Lieutenant Dec 8, 1967
Captain Jun 1, 1969
Major Mar 1, 1975
Lieutenant Colonel Apr 1, 1978
Colonel Sept 1, 1982
Brigadier General Jun 1, 1990
Major General Dec 1, 1992
Lieutenant General Oct 31, 1995

Awards and decorations

Notes

External links

References
This article incorporates text in the public domain from the United States Air Force.

1943 births
2022 deaths
People from Virginia
People from Rochester, New York
United States Air Force Academy alumni
United States Air Force personnel of the Vietnam War
United States Air Force generals
Recipients of the Legion of Merit
Recipients of the Distinguished Flying Cross (United States)
Recipients of the Air Medal
Recipients of the Defense Distinguished Service Medal
Recipients of the Air Force Distinguished Service Medal